Dalem Lake (2001 pop.: 78) is a community in the Cape Breton Regional Municipality.

It is located on Boularderie Island and is the location of Dalem Lake Provincial Park.

Communities in the Cape Breton Regional Municipality
General Service Areas in Nova Scotia